The Nova Phor is an Austrian two-place paraglider that was designed by Hannes Papesch and produced by Nova Performance Paragliders of Innsbruck. It is now out of production.

Design and development
The aircraft was designed as a tandem glider for flight training and as such was referred to as the Phor Bi, indicating "bi-place" or two seater.

The glider is DHV 1-2 Biplace certified.

Specifications (Phor)

References

Phor
Paragliders